Telikin is a brand of touch-screen computer marketed primarily to senior citizens and those who may be uncomfortable or unable to access a traditional keyboard and mouse computer. The home screen features a panel of application buttons in large text on the side for quick access to news, video chat, email and Web The Telikin line of All-In-One desktop computers is developed and distributed by Venture 3 Systems based in Hatfield, Pennsylvania and founded by Fred Allegrezza, launched the Telikin on Black Friday 2010.

Models
Three models are available:
 Telikin Elite II   22" Touch Screen All In One Computer
 21.5” (16:9), 1920 x 1080 Touch Panel
 Intel Quad Core Processor
 4 GB SDRAM
 32 GB Solid State Drive
 1.3MP webcam with microphone
 3W Stereo speakers with SRS technology
 4 USB ports
 4 in 1 memory card reader
 Wireless 802.11 b/g/n
 Wired Keyboard and Mouse

 Telikin Touch, 18.6" Touch Screen All In One Computer.
 18.6 inch LCD touch screen
 Intel Quad Core Processor
 4GB SDRAM
 32GB Solid State Drive
 1.3MP webcam with microphone
 4 USB ports
 4 in 1 memory card reader
 Wireless 802.11 b/g/n
 Wired keyboard and mouse

 Telikin Freedom, 15.6" Touch Screen Laptop Computer.
 15.6 inch LCD touch screen
 Intel Quad Core Processor
 4GB SDRAM
 32GB Solid State Drive
 1.3MP webcam with microphone
 4 USB ports
 4 in 1 memory card reader
 Wireless 802.11 b/g/n
 Wired mouse included

Software
The operating system of the Telikin is a distribution of Linux with other software such as news, video chat, e-mail, and web browsing.
A large print paperback manual accompanies each model which details how to connect the computer account setup, and use of applications.

References

External links

Companies based in Montgomery County, Pennsylvania
Personal computers
Computer-related introductions in 2010